Airport Terminal 1 is a rapid transit station on the Red Line of the Dubai Metro in Dubai, UAE, serving the Terminal 1 of Dubai International Airport.

The station opened as part of the Red Line on 30 April 2010. It is close to Dubai International Airport – Parking B. The station is also close to a number of bus routes.

References

External links
 Dubai Metro Red Line | Airport Terminal 3 To Terminal 1 on YouTube

Railway stations in the United Arab Emirates opened in 2010
Dubai Metro stations